Ricardo Eduardo Tejedo Cota (born December 25, 1972), commonly known as Ricardo Tejedo, is a Mexican actor, director and scriptwriter. He is the son of voice actor and singer Eduardo Tejedo. He provides the voice of various characters in various anime such as Lupin III from the Lupin III series, Doraemon, Mitsurugi Hanagata from Saber Marionette J and a lot of other characters as well as Disney films.

Filmography
 Hellboy in Hellboy (voiceover for David Harbour) (2019)
 Agente Phil Coulson in Capitana Marvel (voiceover for Clark Gregg) (2019)
 Capitán Jack Sparrow in Piratas del Caribe: La Venganza de Salazar (2017) (voiceover for Johnny Depp)
 El Sombrerero Loco in Alicia A Través del Espejo (2016) (voiceover for Johnny Depp)
 Jim Hopper in Stranger Things (voiceover for David Harbour (2016-present)
 Gaviotas in Buscando a Dory (2016) (voiceover for Andrew Stanton, Bob Peterson, Jan Rabson and Jess Harnell)
 Derek Zoolander in 2oolander (2016) (voiceover for Ben Stiller)
 Brian O'Conner in Rápidos y Furiosos 7 (2015) (voiceover for Paul Walker)
 Charles Mortdecai in Mortdecai (2015) (voiceover for Johnny Depp)
 Señor Negocios in La Gran Película de LEGO (2014) (voiceover for Will Ferrell)
 Los Minions in Mi Villano Favorito 2 (2013) (voiceover for Pierre Coffin) 
 Brian O'Conner in Rápidos y Furiosos 6 (2013) (voiceover for Paul Walker)
 Alex el León in Madagascar 3: Europe's Most Wanted (2012) (voiceover for Ben Stiller)
 Gollum in El Hobbit: Un Viaje Inesperado (2012)
 Pitufo Vanidoso in Los Pitufos (2011) (voiceover for Alan Cumming)
 Rugelio in Don Gato y su Pandilla (2011) (Spanish-language version only)
 Capitán Jack Sparrow in Piratas del Caribe: Navegando Aguas Misteriosas (2011) (voiceover for Johnny Depp)
 Rango in Rango (2011) (voiceover for Johnny Depp)
 Brian O'Conner in Rápidos y Furiosos 5in Control (2011) (voiceover for Paul Walker)
 El Sombrerero Loco in Alicia en el País de las Maravillas (2010) (voiceover for Johnny Depp)
 Los Minions in Mi Villano Favorito (2010) (voiceover for Pierre Coffin)
 Brian O'Conner in Rápidos y Furiosos (2009) (voiceover for Paul Walker)
 Harvey Dent/Dos Caras in Batman: El Caballero de la Noche (2008) (voiceover for Aaron Eckhart)
 El Corredor Enmascarado in Meteoro (2008) (voiceover for Matthew Fox)
 Rex Racer in Meteoro (2008) (voiceover for Scott Porter)
 Alex el León in Madagascar 2 (2008) (voiceover Ben Stiller)
 Ian Hawke in Alvin y las ardillas (2007) (voiceover for David Cross)
 Nathan Petrelli in Heroes (2007) (Adrian Pasdar)
 Capitán Jack Sparrow in Piratas del Caribe: En el Fin Del Mundo (2007) (voiceover for Johnny Depp)
 Príncipe Encantador in Shrek Tercero (2007) (voiceover for Rupert Everett)
 Larry Daley in Una noche en el museo (2006) (voiceover for Ben Stiller)
 Brom in Eragon (2006) (voiceover for Jeremy Irons)
 Capitán Jack Sparrow in Piratas del Caribe: El Cofre de la Muerte (2006) (voiceover for Johnny Depp)
 Aramis Lupin III in La Guerra del Dolar (2006)
 Aramis Lupin III in Lupin III: Strange Psychokinetic Strategy (2006)
 Joven Vito Corleone in El Padrino II (1974) (voiceover for Robert De Niro, 2005 redubbing only)
 Alex el León in Madagascar (2005) (voiceover for Ben Stiller)
 Aramis Lupin III in El Mal Día de Vanessa (2005)
 Aramis Lupin III in Peligro en Tokyo (2005)
 Carson in Flightplan (2005)
 Aramis Lupin III in ¡Adios, Nostradamus! (2005)
 Aramis Lupin III in Isla de los Matadores (2005)
 Aramis Lupin III in Muerto o Vivo (2005)
 Príncipe Encantador in Shrek 2 (2004) (voiceover for Rupert Everett)
 Jack Shephard in Lost (2004–2009) (voiceover for Matthew Fox)
 Gollum in El Señor de los Anillos: El Retorno del Rey (2003) (voiceover for Andy Serkis)
 Buddy in Elf: El Duende (2003) (voiceover for Will Ferrell)
 Aramis Lupin III in El Dragón de Maldición (2003)
 Aramis Lupin III in El Viaje al Peligro (2003)
 Aramis Lupin III in Lupin III: El Misterio de Mamo (2003)
 Gaviotas in Buscando a Nemo (2003) (voiceover for Andrew Stanton, Bob Peterson, Jan Rabson and Jess Harnell)
 Drew in Pokémon Advanced (2003–2007)
 Capitán Jack Sparrow in Piratas del Caribe: La Maldición del Perla Negra (2003) (voiceover for Johnny Depp)
 Gollum in El Señor de los Anillos: Las Dos Torres (2002) (voiceover for Andy Serkis)
 Aramis Lupin III in The Pursuit of Harimao's Treasure (2002)
 Aramis Lupin III in El Secreto de Twilight Gemini (2002)
 Aramis Lupin III in El Castillo de Cagliostro (2002)
 Gollum in El Señor de los Anillos: La Comunidad del Anillo (2001) (voiceover for Andy Serkis)
 Kevin Shinick in the VHS dubs of Where in Time is Carmen Sandiego? (2000–2004)
 Detective Mark Kincaid in Scream 3: La Máscara de la Muerte (2000) (voiceover for Patrick Dempsey)
 Comrade Napoleon in Animal Farm (1999)
 Kovu in El Rey León 2: El Tesoro de Simba (1998) (voiceover for Jason Marsden)
 Mitsurugi Hanagata in Chica Marioneta J (1998)
 Shigeru Aoba in Neon Genesis Evangelion (1997–1998)
 Aramis Lupin III in Adios Mujer Liberdad (1996)
 Aramis Lupin III in Leyanda del Oro de Babylon (1994)
 Aramis Lupin III in The Plot of the Fuma Clan (1994)
 Aramis Lupin III in Lupin III (1994–1999)
 Doraemon in Doraemon (1994)
 Chris Kratt in Kratt's Creatures (1994–1999) (voiceover for Chris Kratt)
 Wyatt Earp in Tombstone (1993) (voiceover for Kurt Russell)
 Bill Nye in Bill Nye the Science Guy (1992–1999) (voiceover for Bill Nye)
 Thomas in Thomas the Tank Engine and Friends (1991–1994) (voiceover for Ringo Starr, Michael Angelis, George Carlin, Alec Baldwin and Michael Brandon)
 George Frankly in Mathnet (1987–1992)
 Douglas in Thomas the Tank Engine and Friends (1986) (voiceover for Ringo Starr, Michael Angelis, George Carlin, Alec Baldwin and Michael Brandon)
 Wolff in Spacehunter: Adventures in the Forbidden Zone (1983) (voiceover for Peter Strauss) (his debut)
 Takashi "Shiro" Shirogane in Voltron: Legendary Defender (2016)
 Ginsburg in Kitty Is Not a Cat'' (2018)

References 

Living people
Mexican male voice actors
Mexican voice directors
1973 births
Male actors from Mexico City
Mexican translators